Kerys Julia Harrop  (born 3 December 1990) is an English football central defender/wing back who currently plays for Tottenham Hotspur in the FA WSL. Harrop has also been involved with the England national team at Under 19 and Under 23 level and was part of the Under 19 squad who won the European Championships in Belarus in 2009. She was also a member of the Great Britain team who won a gold medal in Kazan in the 2013 World University Games. With Birmingham City Ladies, she helped them win the FA Cup in 2012 and helped them progress to the semi-finals of the Champions League in 2014.

In addition to her footballing achievements, Harrop has obtained a first class Honours degree from Loughborough University in Sport Science and a master's degree and PGCE Teaching Degree from the University of Wolverhampton.

Harrop holds both British and American citizenship.

References

External links 
 
 
 England FA player profile
 Birmingham City player profile

1989 births
Living people
Birmingham City W.F.C. players
English women's footballers
FA Women's National League players
Women's Super League players
Women's association football defenders
Universiade gold medalists for Great Britain
Universiade medalists in football
Medalists at the 2013 Summer Universiade